Melathulukkankulam is a village in the Virudhunagar district under Kariapatti taluk, in Tamil Nadu, India. It is exactly  from the Virudhunagar-Kalkurichi main road. It has its own post office and the PINCODE is 626109. Agriculture is the main source of income for the residents the village. The village is under the control of Mallankinaru police station.

References

 
Villages in Virudhunagar district